Pseudhammus occipitalis is a species of beetle in the family Cerambycidae. It was described by Lameere in 1893. It is known from the Ivory Coast and Ghana.

References

occipitalis
Beetles described in 1893